This is a timeline of music in the United States. It is divided into several parts.

To 1819
1820–1849
1850–1879
1880–1919
1920–1949
1950–1969
1970–present